The Yangzhou–Liyang Expressway, commonly referred to as the Yangli Expressway is an expressway that connects Yangzhou, Jiangsu, China and Liyang, Jiangsu. It is a spur of G40 Shanghai–Xi'an Expressway and is completely in Jiangsu Province.

It passes through the following cities, all of which are in Jiangsu:
Yangzhou
Zhenjiang
Jintan, Changzhou
Liyang, Changzhou

The expressway crosses the Yangtze over the Runyang Yangtze River Bridge.

References

Chinese national-level expressways
Expressways in Jiangsu